Wolfgang Eduardo Mejías (born March 14, 1983 in Caracas, Distrito Capital) is a Venezuelan épée fencer. Mejias represented Venezuela at the 2008 Summer Olympics in Beijing, where he competed in two épée events.

For his first event, the men's individual épée, Mejias lost the first preliminary match to Norway's Sturla Torkildsen, with a sudden death score of 11–12. Few days later, he joined with his fellow fencers and teammates Francesco Limardo, Silvio Fernández, and Rubén Limardo, for the men's team épée. Although he was considered an alternate, Mejias and his team lost the fifth place match to the Hungarian team (led by Géza Imre), with a total score of 25 touches.

References

External links
Profile – FIE
NBC 2008 Olympics profile

Venezuelan male épée fencers
Living people
Olympic fencers of Venezuela
Fencers at the 2008 Summer Olympics
People from Caracas
1983 births
Pan American Games medalists in fencing
Pan American Games silver medalists for Venezuela
South American Games gold medalists for Venezuela
South American Games medalists in fencing
Fencers at the 2007 Pan American Games
Competitors at the 2010 South American Games
20th-century Venezuelan people
21st-century Venezuelan people